Pay Money to My Pain (stylized as Pay money To my Pain and abbreviated as P.T.P.) was a Japanese alternative rock/metal band. All of the band's lyrics are in English.

History
Early in life, Kei started writing lyrics as a way to cope with his depression and dark feelings. In 2005, after the disbandment of vocalist K's previous band, Gun Dog, he recruited four members and formed Pay money To my Pain. Kei said that his lyrics  expressed his deepest pain and when fans bought the CDs, they were literally buying into his pain. Hence, Pay money To my Pain.

They began to produce songs by themselves before getting noticed by the record label VAP. From there, they released their first major single, "Drop of Ink", on December 6, 2006.

Several months later, they went to California where they recorded their first album, Another Day Comes, which was released on September 12, 2007. The album included "Home", the Buzzer Beater ending song, and "Another Day Comes", the ending song for Ultraseven X.

Guitarist Jin left Pay Money to My Pain in April 2008. The EP Writing in the Diary was released on July 30, 2008.

The band's song "Bury", from the album After You Wake Up, was featured as the opening theme to the anime One Outs. Another of their songs, "The Answer is Not in the TV", was featured in the Konami video game Pro Evolution Soccer 2010.

On June 9, 2010, Pay Money to My Pain released the single Pictures, which is an EP and a DVD sold separately.

On January 26, 2011, Pay Money to My Pain released their third album, Remember the Name.

They performed, along with Lynch, at a charity event on August 10, 2011, called "Shikiyakou -Shikui-", which was hosted by Dead End. All proceeds were donated to the victims of the 2011 Tōhoku earthquake and tsunami on March 11.

In June 2012, vocalist K was hospitalized. That summer, Pay Money to My Pain performed their live show "House of Chaos". They covered Buck-Tick's song "Love Letter" for Parade II -Respective Tracks of Buck-Tick-, released on July 4, 2012. In October, K was again hospitalized and went through rehabilitation; the band declared an activity stop. On December 30, 2012, K died of acute heart failure in his Yokohama home.

On 20 September 2013, they announced a new album called Gene, with songs that K had recorded before his death, as well as songs recorded with guest vocalists. The album, released on November 13, 2013, included "Rain", the theme song of the movie Sekisekirenren, "Innocent in a Silent Room" and a new version of "Sweetest Vengeance".

In December 2013, Pay money To my Pain played their last concert, entitled "From Here to Somewhere", before disbanding.

In January 2014, "Weight of my Pride" was featured in episode 12 of the anime series Hajime no Ippo: Rising. Their song "Respect for the Dead Man" was also used as the theme song for the Nobunagun anime, which began airing on January 5, 2014.

On December 29, 2014, a previously unreleased song named "Room #103", which has K on vocals, was uploaded to Pay money To my Pain's official YouTube channel.

On December 29, 2015, another previously unreleased song named "Relive", which has K on vocals, was uploaded to Pay money To my Pain's official YouTube channel.

On September 11, 2016, the band announced a limited edition box set entitled 10 Years from Drop of Ink including five CDs, two Blu-Rays, a 12" vinyl and various trinkets that would cover their entire career. The box set was slated for a December 6, 2016, release, ten years to the date of the release of their first major single, "Drop of Ink".

On February 2, 2020, Pay money To my Pain played on the second day of "BLARE FEST. 2020" hosted by Coldrain. On this memorable day, PTP played "Ligarse", "Resurrection" (feat. masato from coldrain & Hazuki from lynch.), "Weight of my pride" (feat. MAH from SiM), "Respect for the dead man" (feat. Koie, Teru from Crossfaith, NOBUYA, N∀OKI from ROTTENGRAFFTY), "PICTURES" (feat. Yosh from Survive Said The Prophet, AG from NOISEMAKER), "Voice" (feat. Taka from ONE OK ROCK), "Rain", and "This Life".

Members

Former members
 JIN – guitar
 Jin is currently vocalist for High Speed Boyz. He has also produced for groups such as Greeeen, the band of his brother Hide, and Bareeeeeeeeeen, the combination group of Greeeen and Back-On.
 PABLO – guitar
 Pablo is a Hispanic-Japanese guitarist and is a support guitarist for LiSA, Fake?, Oblivion Dust and Takui Nakajima.
 T$UYO$HI – bass
T$UYOSHI now plays bass in the band THE BONEZ.
 ZAX – drums
ZAX now plays drums in the band THE BONEZ.
 K – vocals
 K, real name , was often in poor physical condition and suffered from mental health issues (he talked about depression and anxiety in some of his songs). On January 10, 2013, Pay Money to My Pain announced that K had died on December 30, 2012, at age 31 due to acute heart failure at his home in Yokohama.

Discography
Albums
 Another Day Comes (September 12, 2007)
 After You Wake Up (March 18, 2009)
 Remember the Name (January 26, 2011)
 Gene (November 13, 2013)

Greatest hits
 Breakfast (October 24, 2012)

Extended plays
 Drop of Ink (December 6, 2006)
 Writing in the Diary (July 30, 2008)
 Pictures (June 9, 2010)

Digital singles
 "All Because of You" (August 27, 2008)
 "Bury" (January 7, 2009) – the opening theme for the One Outs anime

Box sets
 10 Years from Drop of Ink (December 6, 2016)

Compilations
Buzzer Beater Original Soundtrack (September 20, 2007) - "Home-TV Size Version-"
Ultra Seven X Original Soundtrack (October 24, 2007) - "Another Day Comes [TV Size]"
One Outs Original Soundtrack (January 21, 2009) - "Bury (TV Size)"
Parade II -Respective Tracks of Buck-Tick- (July 7, 2012) - "Love Letter" (Buck-Tick cover)
Immortality (March 22, 2013) -  "Weight of my pride (Devilock Night the Final live version)"
Shinjuku Swan Inspired Tracks Selected by Tatsuhiko Shirojima (May 27, 2015) -  "Sweetest vengeance"

Videography
"Drop of Ink"
 "Black Sheep"
 "From Here to Somewhere"

"Another Day Comes"
 "Another Day Comes"
 "Paralyzed Ocean"

"Writing in the Diary"
 "Out of My Hands"
 "All Because of You"

"After You Wake Up"
 "The Answer is Not in the TV'"
 "Same As You Are"

"Pictures"
 "Pictures"

"Remember the Name"
 "Greed"
 "Deprogrammer"
 "Weight of My Pride (Live)"

"Breakfast"
 "Sweetest Vengeance"

"Gene"
 "Rain"

References

External links

Public fan playlist

Japanese alternative rock groups
Japanese hardcore punk groups
Japanese alternative metal musical groups
Japanese post-grunge groups
Musical groups established in 2005
Musical groups from Tokyo
English-language musical groups from Japan